Lala Meredith-Vula (born 1966) is an English and Albanian Kosovian artist and photographer. In 1988 she was included in the Damien Hirst-led Freeze exhibition. Lala is a professor at De Montfort University, Leicester.

Life and work
Lala Meredith-Vula was born in Sarajevo and moved to England in 1970. She attended Trent University, Nottingham (1984–85) and Goldsmiths College (1985–88), then the University of Priština, Kosovo, for postgraduate studies.

In 1988, she was one of the exhibitors in the exhibition Freeze, organised by Damien Hirst which showcased the work of many of the artists who were later to become known as the Young British Artists. Since then Lala has exhibited widely internationally and was recently part of the 2017 Documenta 14 exhibition.

From 1989, she has lectured at various colleges in the United Kingdom, United States and Kosovo. In 1995, she set up the first photography department at the University of Tirana, Albania, and in 2000 a photography department at Priština University.

A particularly significant experience for Meredith-Vula was a series of photographs in Kosovo showing haystacks built by Albanian farmers. The juxtaposition of her cosmopolitan art experience with her provincial origin, asking the question "What is art?", provided a resolution of the two:

She has also photographed women in Turkish baths over a two-year period (6 months of which was gaining permission), and a series showing women standing and moving beneath the surface of water. She has explained this:
"Women and Water" is about the beauty and imperfection of the free body underwater. Many women feel they have been deformed by social influences, particularly in the West. In the water they are free to dissolve and re-appear as a part of nature both classical and expressive.

Her work can be found in a range of major art collections including, but not limited to: Arts Council of Britain, Arthur Andersen Collection, Centre of Photography in Geneva, Collezione La Gaia, Doria Pamphilj Gallery Collection, Doria Pamphilj Palace Museum, The Teseco Foundation, The British Council Collection.

Lala now lectures at De Montfort University in Leicester

Haystacks

Lala has been photographing farmers' haystacks in Eastern Europe since 1989. An on-going series that has been exhibited at the Photographer's Gallery, London, Croatian Fine Art Society, Zagreb, Kosova Art Gallery, Kosova, documenta 14 in Kassel and Marubi Museum, Albania.

Blood Memory

Lala followed and photographed the Blood Feud Reconciliation movement in Kosova in 1990 and 1991 making a series of photographs shown in Kosova Art Gallery in 2015. She was researcher on a BBC documentary film Under the Sun (1991) - Broadcast in 1992 on BBC 1

Awards
1997 London Art Board's "Individual Artists Award".
1998 "Special Jury Prize", PhotoSynkria Festival, Greece.
1998 "Flash Art" Prize, Onufri '98, National Gallery, Albania.
2001 Sargent Fellowship, British School, Rome, Italy.
2002 "Paul Hamlyn Award" nominee.
2006 Bryan Robertson Trust Artist Award.

Notes and references

External links
Lala Meredith-Vula website
New York Times article about Lala Meredith-Vula from documenta14.
De Montfort University staff. Photography and video
Alberto Peola Gallery article
Kosovo's 2.0. article on Lala Meredith-Vula
Wisdom today and forever. Solo exhibition by Lala Meredith-Vula Curated by Monika Szewczyk
Arts Club of Chicago exhibition article 2018

1966 births
Living people
British women artists
Alumni of Goldsmiths, University of London
Alumni of Nottingham Trent University
British contemporary artists
Young British Artists
Yugoslav emigrants to the United Kingdom
Albanian artists